Anna Pasetti was an Italian pastellist active between 1800 and 1806.

Pasetti, a deafmute, lived in Venice and assisted Lodovico Gallina, Jacopo Guarana, and Pietro Tantin as a copyist of both paintings and engravings. Giovanni Antonio Moschini singled her out among Venetian women pastellists. Two pieces, both copies after prints by John Raphael Smith, are in the collection of the Ca' Rezzonico.

References

Italian women painters
18th-century Italian painters
18th-century Italian women artists
19th-century Italian painters
19th-century Italian women artists
Painters from Venice
Pastel artists